Amblypneustes is a genus of sea urchin, belonging to the family Temnopleuridae.

Species
 †Amblypneustes corrali Lambert & Roig in Sánchez Roig, 1949 – Cuba (Upper Oligocene)
 Amblypneustes elevatus (Hutton, 1872)
 Amblypneustes formosus Valenciennes, 1846
 Amblypneustes grandis H. L. Clark, 1912
 Amblypneustes leucoglobus Döderlein, 1914
 Amblypneustes ovum (Lamarck, 1816)
 Amblypneustes pallidus (Lamarck, 1816)
 Amblypneustes pulchellus (H. L. Clark, 1928)

See also
 Holopneustes – a closely related genus

References

 
Temnopleuridae
Taxa named by Louis Agassiz